It Never Rains in Southern California is a compilation album by the British singer and songwriter Albert Hammond. It was released in 1996 under the Collectables Records label.

Track listing
 "Listen to the World" – 2:55
 "If You Gotta Break Another Heart" – 2:38
 "From Great Britain to L.A." – 3:29
 "Brand New Day" – 3:21
 "Anyone Here in the Audience" – 3:55
 "It Never Rains in Southern California" – 3:51
 "Names, Tags, Numbers and Labels" – 4:27
 "Down by the River" – 3:03
 "The Road to Understanding" – 4:20
 "The Air That I Breathe" – 3:47
 "Smokey Factory Blues" – 3:28
 "The Peacemaker" – 2:40
 "Woman of the World" – 3:06
 "Everything I Want to Do" – 2:34
 "Who's for Lunch Today?" – 2:55
 "The Free Electric Band" – 3:23
 "Rebecca" – 3:06
 "The Day the British Army Lost the War" – 4:02
 "For the Peace of All Mankind" – 4:11
 "I Think I'll Go That Way" – 3:34
 "Half a Million Miles from Home" – 2:49
 "I'm a Train" – 3:19

Personnel
Albert Hammond - vocals, guitar
Larry Carlton, Todd Sharpville, Dean Parks - guitar
Joe Osborn, Todd Sharpville - bass guitar
Hal Blaine, Jim Gordon - drums
Larry Knechtel - piano

References

1996 compilation albums
Albert Hammond albums